JRR may refer to:

 J. R. R. Tolkien (1892–1973), English writer, poet, philologist and university professor
 Jaime Robbie Reyne (born 1985), Australian singer
 Jay Robinson Racing, a racing team
 Jiru language
 Jackie Robinson (1919–1972), American baseball player
 Journal of Raptor Research, a peer-reviewed scientific journal covering birds of prey and raptor research